Alois Totuschek (born 2 February 1885, date of death unknown) was an Austrian wrestler. He competed in the middleweight event at the 1912 Summer Olympics.

References

External links
 
 

1885 births
Year of death missing
Olympic wrestlers of Austria
Wrestlers at the 1912 Summer Olympics
Austrian male sport wrestlers
People from Nové Město na Moravě